Vancouver is one of two major cities in Canada to have political parties at the municipal level, the other being Montreal. Municipal politics in Vancouver were historically dominated by the centre-right Non-Partisan Association, a "free enterprise coalition" originally established to oppose the influence of the democratic socialist Co-operative Commonwealth Federation. Following the 2008 municipal election, the social democratic Vision Vancouver became the dominant party in city politics for 10 years until its defeat in the 2018 election.

Parties with elected members

Other active parties

Defunct parties

References
 Vancouver, City of. "Unofficial 2022 Vancouver election results". vancouver.ca. Retrieved 2022-10-16. 

 
Vancouver
Vancouver-related lists
Vancouver